In the 2021–22 season, JS Kabylie is competing in the Ligue 1 for the 53rd season, as well as the Algerian Cup. It is their 53rd consecutive season in the top flight of Algerian football. They competing in Ligue 1 and the Confederation Cup. On September 7, 2021, the new administration effectively took over the commercial registry, allowing Yazid Yarichène to be officially the new head of JS Kabylie to succeed Cherif Mellal, the latter rejected this decision but after the police intervened he found that there was nothing he could do about it. On September 24, Karim Ziani was ordained as Sports Director and stated that JS Kabylie is a big club and the goal is to achieve titles, On the first day he signed international goalkeeper Azzedine Doukha, Mohamed Reda Boumechra and Zakaria Mansouri.

Squad list
Players and squad numbers last updated in 20 October 2021.Note: Flags indicate national team as has been defined under FIFA eligibility rules. Players may hold more than one non-FIFA nationality.

Competitions

Overview

{| class="wikitable" style="text-align: center"
|-
!rowspan=2|Competition
!colspan=8|Record
!rowspan=2|Started round
!rowspan=2|Final position / round
!rowspan=2|First match	
!rowspan=2|Last match
|-
!
!
!
!
!
!
!
!
|-
| Ligue 1

|  
| style="background:silver;"|Runners-up
| 2 November 2021
| 11 June 2022
|-
| Confederation Cup

| First round
| Playoffs round
| 16 October 2021
| 6 February 2022
|-
! Total

Ligue 1

League table

Results summary

Results by round

Matches
The league fixtures were announced on 7 October 2021.

Confederation Cup

First round

The draw for the qualifying rounds was held on 13 August 2021 at the CAF headquarters in Cairo, Egypt.

Playoffs round

Squad information

Playing statistics

|-

|-
! colspan=14 style=background:#dcdcdc; text-align:center| Players transferred out during the season

Goalscorers
Includes all competitive matches. The list is sorted alphabetically by surname when total goals are equal.

Transfers

In

Out

Notes

References

2021-22
Algerian football clubs 2021–22 season